Gerhard Mevissen (born August 27, 1956) is a German artist whose main emphasis is on painting with watercolor and recently also the production of reliefs made of concrete.

Life and career 
Having studied theology in Bonn ( (Germany)) Gerhard Mevissen was trained in social pedagogy and art therapy. Since 1976 Mevissen has started to focus on drawing and water color painting; in 1978/79 he produced drawings during a six-month lasting stay in Madrid. Hereby, his devotion to art became even stronger so that in 1999 he became an autonomous artist.

Awards 
2001 Award of Arts by the German relief organization for blind people (Kunstpreis des Deutschen Blindenhilfswerks Duisburg)

Exhibitions 
2009
Lichtung Stillefeld II, Vernissage, Selfkant
Sommerausstellung International, office for cultural activities Bourg St. Andéol, France
Töne der Stille, Kontschthaus beim Engel, Luxembourg
Fünf Wunden, Bildsetzungen in 7 Kirchen, einer Kindertagesstätte u. dem St. Agatha-Krankenhaus, Cologne
2008
Bleibe im Treibenden, August-Pieper-Haus, Bischöfliche Akademie, Aachen
2007
, Krypta der Basilika Belair, Luxembourg
Espace de Silence, Musek am Syrdal, Luxembourg Roodt-Syre
2002
Blindgänge Madrid-Berlin, Lehmbruck-Museum, Duisburg

Books by Mevissen 
In May 2007 Gerhard Mevissen published his first book "Stillespeicher". It deals with his water color painting cycle "Stillespeicher".

In September 2009 his second book "Lichtung Stillefeld" was published. The book broaches the new concrete park called "Lichtung Stillefeld" in Höngen, Selfkant.

In March 2012 the book "Zurufe" completed the trilogy.

Further reading 
 Moxhet, Albert: Gerhard Mevissen. Über die Materie hinaus. In: Krautgarten-Forum für junge Literatur. Nr. 54, 28. Jg. St.Vith 2009.
 Menges, Thomas: Licht-Fährte und Emmaus-Weg – Gerhard Mevissens "Emmausweg" und die Tradition des Emmausbildes, in: Katechetische Blätter 2007 Heft 2, München.
 Heidrich, Winfried: Gerhard Mevissen. Reise an Rändern, in Visites d'Atelier – Atelierbesuche Band II, Editions mediArt, Luxembourg 2007.
 Dr. Müllejans-Dickmann, Rita: Der Maler Gerhard Mevissen, in: Rotary Magazin 2006, Heft 4, Hamburg.
 Heek, Andreas: Nah am Leben – Blindgänge/Gerhard Mevissen, in: Behinderung und Pastoral, Hrsg. Deutsche Bischofskonferenz, 2004, Köln.
 Dr. Vogt, Christine: Blindgänge Madrid-Berlin – eine Ausstellung im Wilhelm Lehmbruck Museum, in: Dokumentation 7 (Deutsches Blindenhilfswerk) Kunst für Blinde, Duisburg 2003.
 Brüninghaus-Knubel, Corn: Gerhard Mevissen – Blindgänge MadridBerlin, in: Begleithefte Wilhelm Lehmbruck Museum Ausstellungen, Duisburg 2002.
 Dr. Müllejans-Dickmann, Rita: Gerhard- Mevissen – Bildraum Blindgänge – Installationen mit Papierarbeiten u. Betonreliefs, in: artefACt – Kunst im Westen, Jahrgang 10, Aachen 2002
 Tigges, Heribert / Noll, Judith: Weimarer Künstler u. Gerhard Mevissen – Schattenreich, Dokumentationskatalog zur Kunstförderpreisverleihung, Weimar 2001.
 Dr Reuter, Josef: Gerhard Mevissen – Lichtung Schatzkammer, Begleithefte zur Ausstellung, Kramer-Museum Kempen 2001.
 Dr. Müllejans-Dickmann, Rita: Gerhard Mevissen – Leiblinge, in: artefACt – Kunst im Westen, Jahrgang 7, Aachen 1999.
 Kaets, Wilfried: Gerhard Mevissen – Stirb und Werde, Ausstellungskatalog, Köln 1995.
 Kleinen, Wilfried: Bleistiflyrik – Gerhard Mevissen, in: Junges Rheinland, Düsseldorf 1980.

External links 
 
 Mevissen's official website 
 Gallery of several some works by Gerhard Mevissen
 Newspaperarticle Kölner Stadtanzeiger: Bilder voller Schmerz und Trauer
 Krautgarten: Über die Materie hinaus
 Stillespeicher: Information about the book "Stillespeicher" by Gerhard Mevissen
Information and works by Gerhard Mevissen (Krautgarten)

1956 births
Living people
20th-century German painters
20th-century German male artists
German male painters
21st-century German painters
21st-century German male artists
German watercolourists